Heart Chamber Phantoms is Yuka Honda's third solo album, released in 2010 by Tzadik Records.

Track listing

Personnel
 Yuka Honda - Pro Tools, keyboard, sampler, bass, tenorion, guitar, percussion, vocals
 Sean Lennon - drums, synth bass, percussion
 Dougie Browne - drums
 Michael Leonhart - trumpet, flugelhorn, mellophone, vibraphone, bass, wine glass, keyboard, percussion
 Shimmy Hirotaka Shimizu - guitar
 Erik Friedlander - cello
 Pete Drungle - piano
 Jeff Hill - bass
 Courtney Kaiser - vocals
 Scott Seader - vocals

References

2010 albums
Tzadik Records albums
Yuka Honda albums
Avant-garde jazz albums
Electronica albums by Japanese artists
Jazz albums by Japanese artists
Albums by Japanese artists